The 2009 Atlantic Sun Conference baseball tournament was held at Melching Field at Conrad Park on the campus of Stetson University in DeLand, Florida, from May 21 through 24. Jacksonville won its fourth tournament championship to earn the Atlantic Sun Conference's automatic bid to the 2009 NCAA Division I baseball tournament. The event was heavily marred by rain, resulting in two format changes. Originally planned as a six team double-elimination tournament, the format was changed to a single elimination format.

Seeding 
The top six teams (based on conference results) from the conference earn invites to the tournament. Florida Gulf Coast, Kennesaw State, North Florida, and South Carolina Upstate were ineligible for the tournament due to NCAA rules after reclassifying to Division I.

Results

All-Tournament Team 
The following players were named to the All-Tournament Team.

Tournament Most Valuable Player 
Alex Martinez was named Tournament Most Valuable Player. Martinez was an infielder for Jacksonville.

References 

Tournament
ASUN Conference Baseball Tournament
Atlantic Sun baseball tournament
Atlantic Sun baseball tournament